The Southern Anthropological Society (SAS) is an organization in the United States. It publishes a journal titled Southern Anthropologist and issues a newsletter. It awards a James Mooney Award (James Mooney) and Zora Neal Hurston Award (Zora Neal Hurston). The Mooney Award recognizes the best among books about southern anthropological matters.

The group was established in 1966. It holds an annual meeting. William E. Carter was involved in the group.

Robbie Ethridge and Dickson D. Bruce are among recipients of the Mooney award.

References

Website

Professional associations based in the United States
Anthropology-related professional associations
Educational organizations established in 1966
1966 establishments in Mississippi
Organizations based in Mississippi
University of Mississippi
History of the Southern United States